Colonel Francis Scott McFadzean, Baron McFadzean of Kelvinside  (26 November 1915 – 23 May 1992) was a Scottish businessman and economist.

Life

Born in Troon, Ayrshire, McFadzean was educated locally then studied at the University of Glasgow (graduating MA) and the London School of Economics. After working as a civil servant, he fought with the Duke of Cornwall's Light Infantry during World War II, reaching the rank of colonel and seeing service in Egypt.

From 1964 to 1976, McFadzean served as the Managing Director of Royal Dutch Shell. In 1976, he was appointed Chairman of British Airways by Harold Wilson. In 1979, he became the Chairman of Rolls-Royce.

McFadzean was created a Knight Bachelor by Queen Elizabeth II in 1975. On 1 September 1980, he was created a life peer, as Baron McFadzean of Kelvinside, of Kelvinside in the District of the City of Glasgow.

In 1989 he was elected a Fellow of the Royal Society of Edinburgh. His proposers were Sir Samuel Curran, Sir John Atwell, John Hawthorn, W. H. Stimson, and W. W. Fletcher.

Family

He married twice: in 1938 to Isabel Beattie, and following her death in 1987 he married Sonja Khung in 1988.

Works 
 Towards an open world economy. 1972
 Towards an understanding of our new hydrocarbon age. 1973
 The Economics of John Kenneth Galbraith: a Study in Fantasy. 1977
 Introduction to John Jewkes, A return to free market economics. 1978
 Global strategy for growth : a report on north-south issues. 1981

References 

1915 births
1992 deaths
Life peers
Scottish industrialists
British Army personnel of World War II
20th-century Scottish businesspeople
Knights Bachelor
Commanders of the Order of Orange-Nassau
Fellows of the Royal Society of Edinburgh
British civil servants
Civil servants in the Board of Trade
Civil servants in HM Treasury
Alumni of the University of Glasgow
Alumni of the London School of Economics
Duke of Cornwall's Light Infantry officers
Rolls-Royce people
Life peers created by Elizabeth II